Jasin-Amin Assehnoun (born 26 December 1998) is a Finnish professional footballer who plays as a midfielder for Eerste Divisie club FC Emmen and the Finland national team.

Club career
In his youth years, Assehnoun played for Pitäjänmäen Tarmo, HJK Helsinki, Pallokerho-35 and FC Espoo. His first senior team was FC Espoo playing in Kakkonen. In 2018, Assehnoun signed for Veikkausliiga side FC Lahti, signing an initial two year contract with the club.

In July 2021 he signed a one-year contract with Dutch club FC Emmen.

International career
Assehnoun was called up for the UEFA Euro 2020 pre-tournament friendly match against Sweden on 29 May 2021. He made his national team debut in that game, as a starter.

Personal life
Assehnoun was born in Tampere, Finland, to a Moroccan father and a Finnish mother and holds dual Finnish-Moroccan citizenship.

References

External links

1998 births
Living people
Finnish footballers
Finland under-21 international footballers
Finland international footballers
FC Espoo players
FC Lahti players
Kakkonen players
Veikkausliiga players
Association football midfielders
Association football forwards
Finnish people of Moroccan descent
FC Emmen players
Eerste Divisie players
Finnish expatriate footballers
Finnish expatriates in the Netherlands
Expatriate footballers in the Netherlands
Footballers from Tampere